Nowdan (also Romanized as Nowdān and Naudān) is a city and capital of Kuhmareh District, in Kazeroon County, Fars Province, Iran.  At the 2006 census, its population was 2,589, in 581 families.

References

Populated places in Kazerun County

Cities in Fars Province